The Troller T4 was a four-wheel drive/rear-wheel drive vehicle made by Troller. It was only available as a two-door car with a fiberglass body and steel chassis, with a design inspired by the Jeep. It has standard 4WD, a 5-speed manual transmission and Dana axles. The engine is a 3.0 L turbo Diesel built by MWM and was introduced in 2004.

The version looked more like the modern form of the Jeep Wrangler and early Bronco models. 

In January, 2021, Ford Brazil ceased its operations; On October, Troller's assembly plant was deactivated. Ford tried to sell the company, initially, but after an extended negotiation with the Ceará government, Ford Motor Company, its branch headquarters, decided to not sell the division.

Description
It was a two-door vehicle and had two versions: fiberglass hardtop or canvas, both are removable. It was powered by the following engines:

 NGD 3.0 Turbo Diesel Electronic (2005–2014): 163 hp, top speed of 180 km/h. .
 Duratorq 3.2 Turbo Diesel (2014–2021): 200 hp and 470 Nm, top speed of 180 km/h. .

The model had a Dana 44 differential, Eaton gearbox and a 1352 Borg Warner transfer case.

It was the best selling SUV in Brazil for mid-December 2008, when it had 1,104 units sold. In April 2010, Troller announced that the cumulative sales of T4 reached 10,000 units.

See also
Jeep Wrangler
Ford Bronco (sixth generation)

References

External links
official website 

Cars of Brazil
Mini sport utility vehicles
Off-road vehicles
All-wheel-drive vehicles
Rear-wheel-drive vehicles
2000s cars